Football Club of Edinburgh, formerly known as Edinburgh City F.C., is a semi-professional senior Scottish football club which plays in Scottish League One, the third tier of the Scottish Professional Football League. The club play at Meadowbank Stadium, returning to the rebuilt arena in 2022 after five years at Ainslie Park. 

A club known as Edinburgh City was first formed in 1928. It participated in the Scottish Football League in the 1930s and 1940s, but went out of business in the 1950s. The present club adopted the Edinburgh City name in 1986. It applied to join the Scottish Football League in 2002 and 2008, but failed to win election. Edinburgh City became members of the new Lowland League in 2013. The club won the Lowland League championship in 2015 and 2016 and won promotion to the Scottish Professional Football League in 2016.

In 2022, Edinburgh City were promoted to reach Scottish League One for the first time in club’s history after winning 3–2 in the play-off final against Annan Athletic. Following this promotion, on 16 June 2022 the club rebranded, changing its name from Edinburgh City Football Club to Football Club of Edinburgh and unveiling a new badge.

History
The original Edinburgh City was founded in 1928. The club adopted amateur status, with the aim of becoming the Edinburgh equivalent of Queen's Park. Edinburgh City joined the Scottish Football League in 1931. The club played in the Lothian Amateur League during the Second World War and were only admitted to the C Division in 1946. After three more years of struggle, the club left the Scottish Football League in 1949. It switched to junior status and played in the Edinburgh & District Junior League. The club ceased activity completely in 1955, when the local council refused to renew its lease on its home ground, City Park.

A club called Postal United was founded in 1966 and joined the East of Scotland League. Their best league finish was third in 1985–86, having won the Qualifying Cup in 1982–83 and King Cup in 1984–85.

The Edinburgh City Football Club Ltd., which had continued trading as a social club since the football club stopped playing, gave their approval in 1986 for Postal United to use the Edinburgh City F.C. name. The club has participated in the Scottish Cup since the mid-1990s, when it became a full member of the Scottish Football Association. In the 1997–98 Scottish Cup they defeated SFL club, East Stirlingshire, before losing 7–2 to Dunfermline Athletic, then of the Premier Division.

The club applied to join the Scottish Football League in 2002, after Airdrieonians had gone bankrupt, but Gretna won the vote instead. Edinburgh City applied again following Gretna's liquidation in 2008, but this time lost out to Annan Athletic.

Edinburgh City won the East of Scotland Football League Premier Division title for the first time in the 2005–06 season and became members of the new Lowland League in 2013. The club won the Lowland League title in 2014–15 and 2015–16. They then gained promotion to the Scottish Professional Football League by defeating East Stirlingshire in a play-off with a penalty four minutes from time by Dougie Gair. The victory also meant that it was the first time that a non-league club had been promoted to the professional league. The club finished in seventh place during their first Scottish League Two season of 2016–17. They avoided the relegation play-offs in 2018, finishing eight points ahead of bottom placed Cowdenbeath, and fared better in 2018–19, finishing third and qualifying for the League One promotion play-offs; however, they were knocked out by Clyde in the play-off semi-finals, losing 4–0 over two legs. Edinburgh City sat second in the table after 27 games when the truncated 2019–20 season was brought to an early finish in April 2020.

The club began preparations for 2020–21 by announcing the signing of a pre-contract with former striker Ouzy See in June 2020. This was followed up by the signing of defender Lee Hamilton from Stranraer and goalkeeper Kelby Mason in July. The club also confirmed that sporting director Jim Jefferies had departed to return to Hearts. Despite finishing 4th in the 2021–22 season, Edinburgh City navigated through the League One play-offs and earned promotion to the Scottish League One, the 3rd tier in Scottish football, for the first time in their history.

In June 2022 the club changed their name to FC Edinburgh, as they no longer felt the 1986 permission from the Edinburgh City social club to use the name was sufficient, and wished to own their own name outright. When the social club refused to surrender the name, the football club changed to "Football Club of Edinburgh". The club clarified in October 2022 that it should be known as Edinburgh, rather than its full name of FC Edinburgh.

Colours
The club colours are white and black. Postal United F.C. played in all-red, but switched to the traditional colours when it adopted the Edinburgh City identity in 1986.

Stadium

The original club played its home matches at Powderhall Stadium and City Park during its time in the Scottish Football League.

The present club initially played their home fixtures at the Saughton Enclosure, which is now home to Lothian Thistle Hutchison Vale, before switching to Paties Road, where Edinburgh United currently play. Edinburgh City then moved to City Park and then Fernieside. Edinburgh City moved to Meadowbank Stadium, which had been vacated by the move of Meadowbank Thistle to Livingston, in 1996, and gained some additional supporters via those Meadowbank fans who opted to continue watching a local side rather than the relocated team.

In February 2013, the City of Edinburgh Council started a new consultation process about the future of Meadowbank Stadium. Three options for redeveloping Meadowbank were put forward for consideration by Edinburgh Council in December 2013. A planned design was made public in November 2016 and work began after the 2016–17 season ended. Edinburgh City reached an agreement with Spartans to use their Ainslie Park ground for three seasons while Meadowbank is redeveloped. The club announced in March 2021 that they would return to Meadowbank for the 2021–22 season, with the ground now having a 4G artificial playing surface and a 500-seat stand. Due to construction delays because of the Covid-19 pandemic, the club remained at Ainslie Park for the 2021–22 season.

First-team squad

On loan

Coaching staff

Managers

Honours
SPFL League 2

 Runners-up (2): 2019–20, 2020–21

Lowland Football League
Winners (2): 2014–15, 2015–16
East of Scotland Football League
Winners: 2005–06
Runners-up: 2003–04
East of Scotland Football League First Division
Winners: 1995–96
Runners-up: 1989–90
SFA South Region Challenge Cup
Runners-up (3): 2007–08, 2010–11, 2015–16
East of Scotland League Cup
Winners (3): 1992–93, 2001–02, 2012–13
Runners-up (4): 2000–01, 2003–04, 2004–05, 2011–12
King Cup
Winners (2): 1998–99, 1999–00
Runners-up: 2004–05

References

 Sources

External links
Official website

 
Football clubs in Edinburgh
Football clubs in Scotland
Association football clubs established in 1928
1928 establishments in Scotland
East of Scotland Football League teams
Lowland Football League teams
Scottish Professional Football League teams